Doulos (Linear B: do-e-ro) is a Greek masculine noun meaning "slave". Doulos may refer to:

 A slave (δοῦλος) in ancient Greece; see also Slavery in the New Testament and Slavery in antiquity.
 MV Doulos, a passenger ship
 Doulos SIL, a Unicode font produced by the SIL International
 Le Doulos, a 1962 film

See also
 Doula (disambiguation), the feminine form